Night in Port (Swedish: Natt i hamn) is a 1943 Swedish drama film directed by Hampe Faustman and starring Sigurd Wallén, Birgit Tengroth and Alf Kjellin. It was shot at the Råsunda Studios in Stockholm. The film's sets were designed by the art director Nils Svenwall.

Cast
 Sigurd Wallén as Canada Eriksson
 Birgit Tengroth as Maria
 Alf Kjellin as Arnold
 Sigge Fürst as 	Biggen
 Holger Löwenadler as Mårten
 Linnéa Hillberg as Jenny Eriksson
 Rune Halvarsson as Jim
 Bengt Ekerot as 	John
 Gunnar Björnstrand as 	Sven Eriksson
 Carl Ström as 	Captain
 Thore Thorén as 	Kurt
 John Ericsson as Oskar

References

Bibliography 
 Qvist, Per Olov & von Bagh, Peter. Guide to the Cinema of Sweden and Finland. Greenwood Publishing Group, 2000.
 Sundholm, John . Historical Dictionary of Scandinavian Cinema. Scarecrow Press, 2012.

External links 
 

1943 films
Swedish drama films
1943 drama films
1940s Swedish-language films
Films directed by Hampe Faustman
1940s Swedish films